Boniabad or Boneyabad or Beneyabad or Bonyabad or Buniabad or Baniabad may refer to various places in Iran:

 Bonyabad, Ardabil
 Boneyabad, Khvaf, Razavi Khorasan Province
 Boniabad, South Khorasan
 Boniabad, Darmian, South Khorasan Province
 Bonyabad, Zirkuh, South Khorasan Province
 Buniabad, Yazd